Fellows Auctioneers, established in 1876, is an auction house based in Birmingham's Jewellery Quarter and Mayfair, London. They specialise in jewellery, watches, antiques, silver, coins and medals.  In 2018, they were named the leading UK regional auctioneer by Antiques Trade Gazette and as one of the top five auction houses in the UK by Professional Jeweller.

History 

The company's origin can be traced back to the collapse of an order for bicycles in 1876. When William Henry Fellows, who was based in Digbeth, was left with the unwanted order he decided to sell the bicycles by auction. The company grew during the 1920s by selling items belonging to refugees escaping the Russian Revolution. 

During the Second World War, the business sold goods from refugees from the Nazi persecution who were able to smuggle out some of their wealth.  Sales in this era also included lost property from the Royal Mail.

Fellows moved to the firm's current home, Augusta House in the Jewellery Quarter, in 1990. 

The company remains a family firm employing approximately 75 people. Fellows holds 100 sales per year, more than half of which are for jewellery. 

Fellows opened their London office in 2018.

References

External links
 

British auction houses
Retail companies established in 1876
London auction houses
1876 establishments in England